Spartacus and Kalashnikov is a 2002 Russian children's drama film directed by Andrey Proshkin.

Plot 
The film tells about the pupil of the orphanage Shurka Kalashnikov and a shepherd named Spartak, whose friendship is regularly tested for devotion.

Cast 
 Ignat Akrachkov
 Pavel Astakhov
 Svetlana Astakhova
 Tatyana Borisova
 Darya Ekamasova
 Vladimir Menshov
 Andrey Panin
 Elena Fomina		
 Grigori Khristoforov
 Konstantin Kishchuk
 Boris Korchagin

References

External links 
 

2002 films
2000s Russian-language films
Russian children's drama films
2000s children's drama films